The 1897 Chertsey by-election was a parliamentary by-election held on 19 February 1897 for the British House of Commons constituency of Chertsey. It was caused by the resignation of the constituency's sitting Conservative Member of Parliament Charles Harvey Combe, because of his ill-health. Combe had held the seat since the 1892 by-election.

Result

The seat was held for the Conservatives by Henry Currie Leigh-Bennett.

References

1897 elections in the United Kingdom
1897 in England
By-elections to the Parliament of the United Kingdom in Surrey constituencies
19th century in Surrey